List of rivers flowing in the island of Sumba, Indonesia.

In alphabetical order

See also
 List of rivers of Indonesia
 List of rivers of Lesser Sunda Islands

References

 
Sumba
Sumba